A cryptocurrency tumbler or cryptocurrency mixing service is a service that mixes potentially identifiable or "tainted" cryptocurrency funds with others, so as to obscure the trail back to the fund's original source. This is usually done by pooling together source funds from multiple inputs for a large and random period of time, and then spitting them back out to destination addresses. As all the funds are lumped together and then distributed at random times, it is very difficult to trace exact coins. Tumblers have arisen to improve the anonymity of cryptocurrencies, usually bitcoin (hence bitcoin mixer), since the currencies provide a public ledger of all transactions. Due to its goal of anonymity, tumblers have been used to money launder cryptocurrency.

Background 
Tumblers take a percentage transaction fee of the total coins mixed to turn a profit, typically 1–3%. Mixing helps protect privacy and can also be used for money laundering by mixing illegally obtained funds. Mixing large amounts of money may be illegal, being in violation of anti-structuring laws. Financial crimes author Jeffrey Robinson has suggested tumblers should be criminalized due to their potential use in illegal activities, specifically funding terrorism; however, a report from the CTC suggests such use in terrorism-related activities is "relatively limited". There has been at least one incident where an exchange has blacklisted "tainted" deposits descending from stolen bitcoins.

The existence of tumblers has made the anonymous use of darknet markets easier and the job of law enforcement harder.

Peer-to-peer tumblers 
Peer-to-peer tumblers act as a place of meeting for bitcoin users, instead of taking bitcoins for mixing. Users arrange mixing by themselves. This model solves the problem of stealing, as there is no middleman. When it is completely formed, the exchange of bitcoins between the participants begins. Apart from mixing server, none of the participants can know the connection between the incoming and outgoing addresses of coins.

Privacy wallets 
Another alternative to mixing services are "privacy wallets", allowing users to exchange bitcoin in an untraceable manner using so-called CoinJoin transactions. Since no central server is involved, this eliminates the problem of a mixing server stealing money or acting as a law enforcement honeypot. In recent years, criminals have increasingly moved from mixing services to privacy wallets.

Money laundering 
In December 2013 cryptocurrency tumbler Bitcoin Fog was used to launder a part of the 96,000 BTC from the robbery of Sheep Marketplace. 

In February 2015, a total of 7,170 Bitcoin was stolen from the Chinese exchange Bter.com and traced back to the same tumbler. 

In May 2019, FinCEN published a Guidance document that mentioned anonymizing services and mentioned particularly "tumblers".

In February 2020, the alleged operator of a cryptocurrency tumbler was indicted on charges of "money laundering conspiracy, operating an unlicensed money transmitting business and conducting money transmission without a D.C. license."

In April 2021, U.S. Federal authorities arrested the founder of Bitcoin Fog, a Russian-Swedish man named Roman Sterlingov, on charges of money laundering, operating an unlicensed money transmitting business, and money transmission without a license in the District of Columbia. It was alleged that during its 10 years of operation, Bitcoin Fog laundered over 1.2 million Bitcoin at a value of approximately $335 million.

In 2022 the tumblers Blender.io and Tornado Cash were both sanctioned by the United States Department of the Treasury, making it illegal for US citizens, residents and companies to use the service.

In March 2023, the tumbler ChipMixer and 46 million dollars in Bitcoin were seized.

See also 

 Anonymity
 Cryptocurrency and crime
 Privacy and blockchain

References 

Privacy
Money laundering